The Cambridge micropolitan area may refer to:

The Cambridge, Maryland micropolitan area, United States
The Cambridge, Ohio micropolitan area, United States

See also
Cambridge (disambiguation)